Ladislav Švanda (born 14 February 1959 in Prague) is a former Czech cross-country skier who raced from 1982 to 1990. He earned a bronze medal in the 4 × 10 km relay at the 1988 Winter Olympics in Calgary while his best individual Winter Olympics finish was a 15th in the 50 km event at those same games.

Švanda also won a bronze medal in the 4 × 10 km relay at the 1989 FIS Nordic World Ski Championships. His best individual finish at the Nordic skiing World Championships was ninth in the 50 km event in 1987.

Švanda's best career World Cup finish was seventh twice (1985, 1986).

Cross-country skiing results
All results are sourced from the International Ski Federation (FIS).

Olympic Games
 1 medal – (1 bronze)

World Championships
 1 medal – (1 bronze)

World Cup

Season standings

Team podiums
 3 podiums – (3 ) 
{| class="wikitable sortable" style="font-size:95%; text-align:center; border:grey solid 1px; border-collapse:collapse; background:#ffffff;"
|- style="background:#efefef;"
! style="background-color:#369; color:white;"| No.
! style="background-color:#369; color:white;"| Season
! style="background-color:#4180be; color:white; width:120px;"| Date
! style="background-color:#4180be; color:white; width:170px;"| Location
! style="background-color:#4180be; color:white; width:170px;"| Race
! style="background-color:#4180be; color:white; width:130px;"| Level
! style="background-color:#4180be; color:white;| Place
! style="background-color:#4180be; color:white;"| Teammates
|-
| align=center|1 || rowspan=1 align=center|1987–88||  4 February 1988 || align=left|   Calgary, Canada ||  4 × 10 km Relay F || Olympic Games ||3rd || Nyč / Korunka / Benc
|-
| align=center|2 || rowspan=1 align=center|1988–89|| 24 February 1989 || align=left|   Lahti, Finland || 4 × 10 km Relay C/F || World Championships  ||3rd || Petrásek / Nyč / Korunka
|-
| align=center|3|| rowspan=1 align=center|1989–90||11 March 1990 || align=left|   Örnsköldsvik, Sweden  || 4 × 10 km Relay C/F || World Cup || 3rd || Buchta / Nyč / Korunka
|-
|}Note:'''  Until the 1999 World Championships and the 1994 Winter Olympics, World Championship and Olympic races were included in the World Cup scoring system.

References

External links
 
 
 

Czech male cross-country skiers
Czechoslovak male cross-country skiers
1959 births
Cross-country skiers at the 1988 Winter Olympics
Olympic bronze medalists for Czechoslovakia
Olympic cross-country skiers of Czechoslovakia
Living people
Place of birth missing (living people)
Olympic medalists in cross-country skiing
FIS Nordic World Ski Championships medalists in cross-country skiing
Medalists at the 1988 Winter Olympics
Sportspeople from Prague